Laurence George "Laurie" Main (29 November 1922 – 8 February 2012) was an Australian actor best known for hosting and narrating the children's series Welcome to Pooh Corner, which aired on The Disney Channel during the 1980s.

Born in Melbourne, Main moved to the UK at the age of 16, making his acting debut in The Yellow Balloon. He emigrated to the United States in 1960, studying with Agnes Moorehead.

His television and film guest appearances include Wagon Train, Alfred Hitchcock Presents, Maverick, I Spy, The Girl from U.N.C.L.E., Get Smart, The Andy Griffith Show, The Three Stooges Go Around the World in a Daze, That Girl, Ironside, The Monkees, Hogan's Heroes, Mayberry R.F.D., The Ghost & Mrs. Muir, Daniel Boone, Family Affair, Bewitched, The Partridge Family, McMillan & Wife, Land of the Lost, Little House on the Prairie, Punky Brewster and Murder, She Wrote. Main also appeared in The Facts of Life Goes to Paris in 1982.

His stage work included The Diary of a Nobody (1954/5)  and Waltz of the Toreadors (1956) in London's West End; and he made several appearances on Broadway.

He also appeared on many television commercials.

Main also did considerable voice work for Disney, having supplied the voice of Dr. Watson in the 1986 animated film The Great Mouse Detective. He also narrated the animated shorts Winnie the Pooh Discovers the Seasons (1981) and Winnie the Pooh and a Day for Eeyore (1983), as well as serving as the story reader on many Disney Read-Along records, audio cassettes and compact discs.

Main died on 8 February 2012 in Los Angeles, California at the age of 89.

Filmography

The Yellow Balloon (1953) as Bibulous Customer
The Master Plan (1955) as Johnny Orwell
Shop Spoiled (1954) as Coffee Stall Customer
Delavine Affair (1954) as Summit
The Adventures of Robin Hood (1956, TV Series) as Cook
The New Adventures of Charlie Chan (1958, TV Series) as Cecil Meadows
The Whole Truth (1958) as Party Guest
Fair Game (1958, TV Series) as George Square
Sunday Night Theatre (1958-1959, TV Series) as Mihaly Farkas / Father Looe
Dow Hour of Great Mysteries (1960, TV Series) as Connors
Shirley Temple Theatre (1960, TV Series) as Archbishop of Canterbury
The DuPont Show of the Month (1960, TV Series)
Maverick (1960-1961, TV Series) as Crimmins / Marquis of Bognor
Vanity Fair (1961, TV Series)
Bachelor Father (1961, TV Series) as Beechim
Wagon Train (1961, TV Series) as Father Francis Xavier Sweeney
Alfred Hitchcock Presents (1961, TV Series) as Wilkins
Play of the Week (1961, TV Series) as Roger Compton
Jane Eyre (1961, TV Movie) as St. John Rivers
Great Ghost Tales (1961, TV Series) as Sir Robert Tyne
Alcoa Premiere (1961, TV Series) as Sergeant Hadley
Ichabod and Me (1961, TV Series) as Arthur Barnsdall
The Dick Powell Theatre (1961, TV Series) as Harold Elrod
Hawaiian Eye (1962, TV Series) as Sir Wilfrid
The Detectives Starring Robert Taylor (1962, TV series) as Colonel Driscoll
The Phantom of the Opera (1962) as Forbes (uncredited)
The Punch and Judy Man (1963) as 2nd Drunk
The Three Stooges Go Around the World in a Daze (1963) as Carruthers (uncredited)
The DuPont Show of the Week (1963, TV Series) as J.T. Cooper
The Third Man (1963-1965, TV Series) as Dennis Nesbit
Daniel Boone (1964, tv show) as Benjamin FranklinThe Jack Benny Program (1964, TV Series) as Dr. GrangerI'd Rather Be Rich (1964) as HarrisonMy Fair Lady (1964) as Hoxton Man Not Hoston (uncredited)Honey West (1965, TV Series) as AntoineMunster, Go Home! (1966) as Minor Role (uncredited)I Spy (1966, TV Series) as LuchesiThe Girl from U.N.C.L.E. (1966, TV Series) as Shah KarumHogan's Heroes (1966-1969, TV Series) as Air Marshal Woodhouse / Colonel Wembley / Major Shawcross / Col. FranzGet Smart (1967, TV Series) as Dr. RamseyThe Scorpio Letters (1967, TV Movie) as TysonThe Andy Griffith Show (1967, TV Series) as Robling FlaskThe Iron Horse (1967, TV Series) as Father Jean LouisThat Girl (1967, TV Series) as Grimsley / Maitre D'Bewitched (1967-1971, TV series) as Tour Guide / Guide / FrancisThe Guns of Will Sonnett (1968, TV Series) as JudgeIronside (1968, TV Series) as HarrisThe Monkees (1968, TV Series) as Mr. FriarFamily Affair (1968-1970, TV Series) as Mr. Edgemont / Passenger / Mr. SmyserTarget: Harry (1969) as Simon ScottMayberry R.F.D. (1969, TV Series) as Thornton AveryThe Ghost & Mrs. Muir (1970, TV Series) as NeroDaniel Boone (1965-1970, TV Series) as Stinch / Sir Samuel Peacham / Benjamin FranklinOn a Clear Day You Can See Forever (1970) as Lord PercyDarling Lili (1970) as French GeneralNight Chase (1970, TV Movie) as ToutCat Ballou (1971, TV Movie) as Land DeveloperThe Doris Day Show (1971, TV Series) as Father KingsleyPrivate Parts (1972) as Reverend MoonThe Partridge Family (1972, TV Series) as Frederic La ForgeMcMillan & Wife (1973, TV Series) as AlfieThe Strongest Man in the World (1975) as Mr. ReedyMy Father's House (1975, TV Movie) as Food EditorLand of the Lost (1976, TV Series) as William BlandingsFreaky Friday (1976) as Mr. MillsHerbie Goes to Monte Carlo (1977) as DuvalFive Weeks in a Balloon (1977, TV Movie) (voice)Black Beauty (1978, TV movie) as Farmer Grey / Squire Douglas Gordon / Pipe Smoking Stable Owner (voice)Time After Time (1979) as Inspector GregsonABC Weekend Specials (1979, TV Series) as ReggieThe Competition (1980) as Judge WyethCBS Children's Mystery Theatre (1980, TV Series) as Dr. WatsonTarzan, the Ape Man (1981) as Club Member (voice)Winnie the Pooh Discovers the Seasons (1981, Short) as Narrator (voice)Little House on the Prairie (1981, TV Series) as Major GuffeyThe Facts of Life Goes to Paris (1982, TV Movie) as ReggieWinnie the Pooh and a Day for Eeyore (1983, Short) as Narrator (voice)Casablanca (1983, TV Series) as Wilf ParkerWelcome to Pooh Corner (1983, TV Series) (voice)Monchhichis (1983, TV series) (voice)Cheech & Chong's The Corsican Brothers (1984) as NarratorDumbo's Circus (1985, TV Series) (voice)My Chauffeur (1986) as JenkinsThe Great Mouse Detective (1986) as Dr. Watson (archive sound)Punky Brewster (1988, TV series) as AnnouncerThe New Yogi Bear Show (1988, TV series) (voice)Wicked Stepmother (1989) as ClientPaddington Bear (1989-1990, TV Series) (voice)Rover Dangerfield (1991) (voice)Murder, She Wrote (1992, TV Series) as ManMom and Dad Save the World (1992) as Chorus MasterRobin Hood: Men in Tights (1993) as Wedding GuestThe Thief and the Cobbler (1993) as The BrigandPiglet's Big Game'' (2003) as the Narrator

References

3. Demetria Fulton previewed Main on The Facts of Life; episode titled, "The Facts of Life Goes to Paris “(09/25/1982).

External links
 
 
 

1922 births
2012 deaths
Australian male stage actors
Australian male film actors
Australian male television actors
Australian male voice actors
British emigrants to the United States
Australian emigrants to the United Kingdom
Audiobook narrators